Anaconda (Blanche Sitznski) is a supervillain appearing in American comic books published by Marvel Comics. She has generally been associated with the Serpent Society, often as a foe of Captain America. Sitznski was given her superhuman abilities by the Roxxon corporation, giving her the codename Anaconda due to her powerful, adamantium-enhanced arms which she uses to constrain or crush her opponents. Her first appearance was as part of the Serpent Squad, when they tried to retrieve the Serpent Crown only to be thwarted by Thing, Stingray and Triton. She later became a core member of Sidewinder's Serpent Squad and remained a member when they became the Serpent Society.

Publication history

Anaconda was created by Mark Gruenwald and Ralph Macchio and first appeared in Marvel Two-in-One #64 in June 1980.

The character received biographical entries in The Official Handbook of the Marvel Universe #1 (1983), The Official Handbook of the Marvel Universe Deluxe Edition #1 (1985), Gamer's Handbook of the Marvel Universe #4 (1988), The Official Handbook of the Marvel Universe Master Edition #1 (1990), and Deadpool Corps: Rank and Foul #1 (2010).

Fictional character biography

Origin
Blanche "Blondie" Sitznski was born in Pittsburgh, Pennsylvania.  She worked as a steelworker until executives at the Roxxon Oil Company selected her to become a special agent in covert operations. She was already well-adjusted to villainy, as she was the calisthenics instructor at the criminal trainer Taskmaster's Academy. It was there that she trained several women in hand-to-hand combat, most notably Diamondback and Snapdragon. She was eventually taken to Roxxon's Mutagenic Laboratory and bioengineered by Roxxon's Mutagenics Division to have various permanent serpentine features. Her entire skeletal structure was laced with an artificial adamantium, giving her the ability to elongate her arms and legs, which she uses to constrict her enemies. She had also been surgically given gills, which allows her to breathe underwater. She has tiny scales on her face, neck, chest, and back, and small fins on her lower cheeks. Though Anaconda's trade characteristic is her blonde hair, she is actually a natural brunette. Anaconda loves to listen to show tunes, and is particularly fond of Thoroughly Modern Millie.

Serpent Squad
Her first mission as part of the second Serpent Squad grouped her with three other snake-themed villains: Sidewinder, Black Mamba, and Death Adder. They were given the task to retrieve the Serpent Crown for the Roxxon company president, Hugh Jones. During the mission, the group came into conflict with the Fantastic Four's Thing, Stingray and the Inhuman Triton. Anaconda eagerly battled the Thing, and was able to apprehend him with ease. They found the Serpent Crown, but the Thing and Triton retaliated, defeating Anaconda, Black Mamba and Death Adder by trapping them underwater.

Anaconda freed herself and her teammates from their underwater captivity using her brute strength, and they were sent on another mission—this time, to search for a powerful weapon known as the Micro-Scanner. After battling Iron Man, Anaconda and the others were defeated and presumably taken to prison.

Serpent Society
The trio somehow escaped, and sought out Sidewinder for payment from their first mission together. He gave them their share of the money, plus more, inviting them to join his new criminal organization, the Serpent Society. Anaconda hesitantly accepted the offer. At the orientation, Sidewinder grouped Anaconda together with Cobra and the Rattler to perform an initiation test. Their job was to steal equipment from the bankrupt Brand Corporation. Constrictor, annoyed with the whole idea of the Serpent Society, spied on Anaconda's group and called the Avengers hotline to tip them off. Captain America showed up just as Anaconda and the others were pulling their heist, and Anaconda ordered Cobra and Rattler to return to Sidewinder with the apparatus. During an intense battle with the Avenger, Anaconda was able to wrap her arms around Captain America. She started to crush his bones, but one well-placed hit of his shield knocked her out, and she was taken to jail.

Teleported out by Sidewinder, Anaconda paid a visit to Constrictor, beating him to near death. Anaconda also participated in the mission to murder M.O.D.O.K., but was knocked out with a mind-blast early in the fight. However, her teammates Cottonmouth and Death Adder were able to kill him, and Anaconda carried his corpse to A.I.M. for the large sum profit they were promised. Soon after, Anaconda's best friend, Death Adder, was murdered by the Scourge of the Underworld. She vowed to find the murderer and avenge his death.

When Viper invaded the Serpent Society, Anaconda willingly switched sides and attacked Diamondback when she brought Captain America and D-Man to help, but was defeated by Diamondback's acid-tipped diamonds.  Later, Cobra took over leadership and he and Anaconda had a mutual respect for each other, having worked together on many missions in the past. Anaconda assisted the Serpent Society on a mission against the X-Men, and fought Colossus. Anaconda also took time out to help Diamondback's date with Captain America (unbeknownst to her at the time) go smoothly. Upon learning that Diamondback knew the true identity of her sworn enemy, Captain America, Anaconda turned on Diamondback. Anaconda served as bailiff during her trial where she voted guilty, and battled Captain America after the trial.

Anaconda eventually became romantically involved with one of the new recruits, Puff Adder. They, along with Rock Python were sent to retrieve Diamondback, who had escaped her death sentence. They eventually crashed their Serpent Saucer into Diamondback's apartment, where she, Black Mamba, and Asp were hiding out. The girls were easily taken out by Anaconda and her allies, but their kidnapping attempt was interrupted by an invitation to join Superia's all-female villain group, the Femizons. Diamondback, Black Mamba, and Asp accepted, as did Anaconda, reluctantly. While on Superia's ship, Anaconda caused quite a ruckus with the villainess Quicksand. She also took part in the attack on Captain America and Paladin, but fled when the Femizons disbanded. She reappeared with the Serpent Society when super hero undercover, Jack Flag, attempted to join the group to replace a retired Cobra. Anaconda battled Jack Flag and his partner Free Spirit until Force Works showed up and put an end to the battle.

Six Pack
Much later, Anaconda took part in the Bloodsport tournament in hopes of winning the prize money. She easily took out her first opponent, Forearm, but got her neck slit by her second opponent, Puma. Her ability to heal quickly proved useful, as she survived the attack and returned to the Serpent Society for their mission to exact revenge on Diamondback once again. She then joined S.H.I.E.L.D.'s new espionage team, the Six Pack. She eventually turned on them, along with Constrictor, Solo, and Domino, to join forces with Cable, who was trying to create a sanctuary with his newfound powers. She was also warped into Cable's mind, where she saved Cable's life by grabbing onto him before he could get sucked into a techno-organic virus. She continued to work with the Six Pack as they committed acts of terrorism in Rumekistan to diminish Cable's reputation. Cable exacted revenge on the Six Pack by defeating them all and returning them to the United States.

Anaconda was later seen as one of the supervillains defeated by the New Warriors and was tied up and gagged with a form of Spider-Man's web fluid.

Secret Invasion
During the Secret Invasion storyline, Anaconda rejoined the Serpent Society. The Society held a number of civilians hostage in a compound in the American Midwest claiming they were protecting themselves from the Skrulls. However, they were easily defeated by Nova and his new Nova Corps.

Later, several Serpent Society members including Anaconda, Black Mamba, Bushmaster and Cottonmouth fought members of the New Avengers in a semi-tropical locale. Anaconda was then seen playing poker in Reno, Nevada. She was accused by a woman named Desire of running an illegal underwater animal fighting ring. Deadpool later corrected her, stating that the animal ring was an Australian reality show and that the only crime Anaconda is guilty of is "being a bleach queen." She also battled the mutants Rockslide and Anole with the Serpent Society, under Mister Negative's contract. The Serpent Society, while on an assignment to kill a man named Marcus Johnson, encountered Taskmaster and Deadpool. During the skirmish, Anaconda's arm was dismembered by Deadpool's sword. Anaconda and her allies were then arrested by S.H.I.E.L.D.

Returning to the Serpent Society
Most recently, Anaconda has been seen working with the Serpent Society on several missions. One mission had her battling the Avengers, though she was once again arrested. On another mission, Anaconda robbed a bank alongside teammates Asp, Cottonmouth, Bushmaster, and Puff Adder.  They encountered the mutant Hope Summers, who subsequently defeated Anaconda with a barrage of headbutts. She also briefly served as a member of the Doom Maidens.

Alongside Sidewinder, Black Mamba, and the second Death Adder, Anaconda battled Elektra after being hired by the Assassin's Guild to kill her allies Matchmaker, Cape Crow, and Kento Roe.

Serpent Solutions
As part of the All-New, All-Different Marvel event, Anaconda appears as a member of Viper's Serpent Society under its new name Serpent Solutions.

During the "Opening Salvo" part of the Secret Empire storyline, Anaconda was with Serpent Solutions at the time when they are recruited by Baron Helmut Zemo to join the Army of Evil. She also briefly battled the X-Men alongside her teammates.

Anaconda later attended former Six Pack teammate Domino's birthday party.

During The Thing's bachelor party, Anaconda and other female members of the Serpent Society hid in a giant cake, and attacked the Thing and his superhero guests after they had several alcoholic beverages. Anaconda and the others were defeated after a battle, and taken into custody.

Anaconda was among several animal-themed super-villains captured and hunted by Kraven the Hunter. Alongside the rest of the Serpent Society, Anaconda joined Vulture in rebelling against human-controlled drones that had been set up to hunt the criminals. When the group gained their freedom, they were ambushed and apprehended by the Avengers.

Powers and abilities

Anaconda has the superhuman ability to elongate her limbs and constrict her opponents. Her arms and legs are able to elongate to about one and a half times their normal length (though most artists show her greatly exceeding that length), while her muscles engorge with blood, giving the appearance of massive, snake-like limbs. Once she has entwined her limbs around a human-sized foe, there are very few human beings able to break free of her grip. She has also been surgically given gills, which allow her to breathe underwater, and modified lungs for extracting oxygen from water. Due to all the bio-engineering performed on her, Anaconda has incredible recuperative abilities and she is able to heal non-fatal wounds several times faster than a normal human being. Her strength is enhanced beyond normal human levels and she is an excellent swimmer.

Her entire skeletal structure is laced with an adamantium alloy-based substance, increasing her durability.

Anaconda is a skilled combatant, using street-fighting techniques to accommodate her elongating arms.

Other versions

Ultimate Marvel
Anaconda appears in the Ultimate Universe as a member of the all-female Serpent Squad. Searching for the Serpent Squad at Project Pegasus, the girls are attacked by the Fantastic Four and a battle ensues. Mister Fantastic is able to take out Anaconda, and she is later taken into custody. She looks significantly different from her Earth-616 counterpart, depicted as much thinner and less masculine, though she retains her scales. She later reappears, once again with the Serpent Squad attempting to steal the Serpent Crown back from Project Pegasus. However, she and her cohorts are defeated by Spider-Man, Rick Jones, Iceman, and Human Torch. Anaconda then left the Serpent Squad and joined the gang called the Serpent Skulls, becoming a lieutenant. She had her own gang of biker girls. However, during the final battle with the All-New Ultimates, Anaconda was defeated by Kitty Pryde and taken into custody. Anaconda somehow escaped imprisonment and rejoined the Serpent Squad, seeking out the crown for one more time. She and the Squad were stopped, however, by Spider-Man and the All-New Ultimates.

Marvel Adventures
Anaconda appears as a member of the Serpent Society in the Marvel Adventures universe.  With the other members, she briefly battles Spider-Man and holds him in her grip.  However, as soon as Lizard is transformed into a monstrous beast, Anaconda and the Serpents teleport away.

Earth-33900
In the Avengers series dedicated to the American Armed Forces, Anaconda appears as a member of the Serpent Society. After her teammates Viper, Eel, and Death Adder fail to capture a secret parcel carried by Sergeant Joe Wilton, Cobra sends Anaconda to Atlanta International Airport to aid them. Hanging from a Serpent Saucer piloted by Cobra, Anaconda manages to capture both the sergeant and his parcel. After discovering what was inside the bag, Anaconda refuses to show Cobra and tells him they are going to let Sergeant Wilton and the bag go. She also reveals her father was a marine. Iron Man and Hawkeye attack the saucer, and Anaconda stops Cobra from blasting Hawkeye. This allows Iron Man to defeat Cobra and subsequently Anaconda.

Marvel Super Hero Adventures
In this comic book series aimed toward young children, Anaconda appears as a member of the Serpent Society. Alongside her teammates, Anaconda battled Ms. Marvel, Spider-Man, and the Society's newest recruit, Garden Snake.

In other media
Anaconda appeared in The Avengers: Earth's Mightiest Heroes, voiced by Vanessa Marshall. This version is a member of the Serpent Society. She first appeared in the first season episode "Ultron-5", fighting the Avengers alongside the rest of the Serpent Society. In the second season episode "Along Came a Spider...", Anaconda and the Serpent Society worked to free Viper and King Cobra from S.H.I.E.L.D.'s custody. They were successful in their mission, although they faced Spider-Man and Captain America and eventually withdrew. In the episode "Yellowjacket", Anaconda and the Serpent Society were chased by the titular vigilante.

References

External links
 Anaconda at Marvel.com
 Blondie: An Anaconda Fansite (Archived 2009-10-25)
 

Characters created by Mark Gruenwald
Characters created by Ralph Macchio
Comics characters introduced in 1980
Fictional characters from Pennsylvania
Fictional characters from Pittsburgh
Fictional characters who can stretch themselves
Fictional mercenaries in comics
Marvel Comics characters with accelerated healing
Marvel Comics characters with superhuman strength
Marvel Comics female supervillains
Marvel Comics mutates